Kodjoe is a surname. Notable people with the name include:

Boris Kodjoe (born 1973), Austrian-born actor of German and Ghanaian descent
Emmanuel Kodjoe Dadzie (born 1916), Ghanaian diplomat
Ofie Kodjoe, American Ghanaian singer, actress, radio presenter and motivational speaker

See also
Kodjo
Kojo (disambiguation)